Michael Neil Forster (born December 9, 1957) is an American philosopher and the Alexander von Humboldt Professor, holder of the Chair in Theoretical Philosophy, and Co-director of the International Center for Philosophy at Bonn University. Previously he was Glen A. Lloyd Distinguished Service Professor in Philosophy and the College at the University of Chicago. Forster is known for his expertise on hermeneutics.

Books
 Herder's Philosophy (Oxford University Press, 2018)
 After Herder (Oxford University Press, 2012)
 German Philosophy of Language from Schlegel to Hegel and Beyond (Oxford University Press, 2011) 
 After Herder (Oxford University Press, 2010) 
 Kant and Skepticism (Princeton University Press, 2008) 
 Wittgenstein on the Arbitrariness of Grammar (Princeton University Press, 2004) 
 Herder: Philosophical Writings (Ed., Cambridge University Press, 2002) 
 Hegel's Idea of a "Phenomenology of Spirit" (University of Chicago Press, 1998) 
 Hegel and Skepticism (Harvard University Press, 1989)

References

21st-century American philosophers
Phenomenologists
Continental philosophers
Philosophy academics
Gadamer scholars
Living people
1957 births
University of Chicago faculty
Hermeneutists
Herder scholars